Olga Rautenkranzová (22 September 1891 – ?) was a pioneering Czech director and screenwriter active during the silent era. She is noted as being the first Czech women director. Little has been published about her life and career.

Filmography
 Kozlonoh (1918)
 Učitel orientálních jazyků (1918)

References

1891 births
Year of death unknown
Czech film directors
Czech screenwriters
Women film pioneers
Czech women film directors
Czech women screenwriters
Artists from Prague